Nando may refer to:

People
 Nando (name), a male given name or nickname (short for Fernando, Ferdinando, etc.)
 Fernando da Piedade Dias dos Santos (born 1950), known as Nandó, Angolan politician and former Prime Minister of Angola
 Nando García (born 1994), Spanish footballer Fernando García Puchades
 Nando Gómez (born 1984), Spanish footballer Fernando Gómez Herrera
 Nando González (1921–1988), Spanish footballer Fernando González Valenciaga
 Kunio Nando (1916–2011), Japanese speed skater and coach
 Nando (footballer, born May 1967), Spanish footballer Fernando Martínez Perales
 Nando (footballer, born October 1967), Spanish footballer Fernando Muñoz García
 Nando (footballer, born 1990), Portuguese footballer Fernando Henrique Quintela Cavalcante
 Nando (Mozambican footballer) (1982–2007), Mozambican footballer Fernando Paulo Matola
 Nando (Timorese footballer) (born 1985), East Timorese footballer
 Nando (futsal player) (born 1987), Brazilian futsal player
 Nando, former lead singer of Los Super Reyes, a Mexican-American cumbia group
Fernando Tatís Jr. (born 1999), Dominican baseball player

Other uses
 Nando (media company), an American internet news service and Internet service provider
 Typhoon Nando (disambiguation), a designation assigned by the Philippine Atmospheric, Geophysical and Astronomical Services Administration
 Nando, singular form of Nandor (Middle-earth), a term for a group of Elves in J. R. R. Tolkien's fictional Middle-earth
 Nando, a European Union database on Notified Bodies

See also
 Nando's, a South African casual dining restaurant chain
 Nando's Coffee House, a coffee house based in London (17th and 18th centuries)